The  is a small Japanese drum. It has a short but wide body with animal skin drumheads on both its upper and bottom sides.  The hide is first stretched on metal hops, then stretched over the body.  Similar to the tsuzumi and to African talking drums, both drum heads are bound together with cords so that the drum heads are bound by each other.  Like the larger taiko drums, the shime-daiko is played with sticks called "bachi," while it's suspended on a stand.  Being very taut, the shime-daiko has a higher pitch than that of normal taiko.  Shime-daiko are used in various Japanese music ensembles, from nagauta, hayashi, taiko, to folk music, or min'yō ensembles.

Etymology 
The word "shime-daiko" comes from a larger word "tsukeshime-daiko" often shortened to simply, "shime-daiko" or "shime". The prefix "tsukeshime" incorporates the verbs tsukeru ("to fasten; to attach"), and shimeru ("to fasten; to tie"); the compound connotes a tight, secure fastening.

External links
Japanese Traditional Music
 Shime-Daiko

Drums
Membranophones
Japanese musical instruments